The year 606 BC was a year of the pre-Julian Roman calendar. In the Roman Empire, it was known as year 148 Ab urbe condita. The denomination 606 BC for this year has been used since the early medieval period, when the Anno Domini calendar era became the prevalent method in Europe for naming years.

Events
 King Ding of Zhou succeeds King Kuang of Zhou as Zhou Dynasty ruler.

Births

Deaths

References